Patrick Haliburton was the first Archdeacon of Totnes.

References

Archdeacons of Totnes